Simon Wood may refer to:

 Simon Wood (chef) (born 1977), British cook
 Simon Wood (footballer) (born 1976), English footballer
 Simon Wood (politician), Australian politician